Jackson (formerly, Botilleas, Botilleas Spring, Bottileas, Bottle Spring, and Botellas) is a city in and the county seat of Amador County, California.  Its population was 4,651 at the 2010 census, up from 3,989 at the 2000 census. The city is accessible by both State Route 49 and State Route 88.

Geography and geology
Jackson Creek traverses the city. Alluvial soils such as Pardee cobbly loam is found throughout the Jackson area.

Climate
According to the Köppen climate classification, Jackson has a hot-summer Mediterranean climate (abbreviated Csa).

History

Early history
The area was inhabited by the Northern Sierra Indians, who occupied areas along creeks, spring, and seep areas, including permanent and seasonal drainages, flat ridges, and terraces. Therefore, areas along watercourses are considered likely locations for prehistoric cultural resources.  Permanent villages were usually placed on elevations above seasonal flood levels. Surrounding areas were used for hunting and seed, acorn, and grass gathering.

Recent history
Jackson, named after Colonel Alden Jackson, was founded in 1848 around a year-round spring. Settlement of the region by American pioneers was stimulated by the discovery of gold in the Sierra foothills around 1848. The settlement was named for a local lawyer who was liked by miners named Alden Appola Moore Jackson.  Although Amador County was an important mining center, its county seat of Jackson was not typical of the early gold camps. The camp grew quickly, as besides being a popular mining spot, it was also a convenient stopping place on the road from Sacramento to the Southern Mines. The camp became an important supply and transportation center for the neighboring towns, and by 1850, its population had reached an estimated 1,500. Jackson grew first as a watering hole for cattle, then as one of the earliest and most durable of the mother lode's hard rock mining areas. In 1853, Jackson became the county seat of newly formed Amador County, California. Previously, from 1851 to 1852, it had been the county seat of Calaveras County.

Placer mining gave out by the 1860s, replaced by hard rock mining. One of the town's most prominent historical landmarks, the Kennedy Mine, began operation in 1860; at the time of its closure during World War II in 1942, it was the deepest gold mine in North America, at 1802 m (5912 ft). On August 27, 1922, 47 miners became trapped when a fire broke out in the Argonaut mine. All 47 men died in the fire, but the last body was not recovered until over a year later. The Argonaut mine incident was the worst gold mine disaster in US history.

In October 1942, the US government passed the War Production Board Limitation Order, which signaled the demise of gold mining in California. The government needed men for the war and gold was not considered a strategic war metal.

Landmarks
 Argonaut and Kennedy Mines: California Historical Landmark No. 786.

 Jackson Gate: Jackson Gate, on the north fork of Jackson Creek, takes its name from a fissure in a reef of rock that crosses the creek. In 1850, about 500 miners worked here and the first mining ditch in the county was dug here; its water sold for $1 per inch, CHL No. 118.
 Site of Jackson's Pioneer Jewish Synagogue: On September 18, 1857, Congregation B'nai Israel of Jackson dedicated on this site the first synagogue in the Mother Lode. High holy day worship continued until 1869 when the larger Masonic Hall was used to accommodate the congregation. The wooden structure then served as a schoolhouse until 1888. Relocated onto a nearby lot, it became a private dwelling, and was razed in 1948, CHL No. 865. The Jackson Pioneer Jewish Cemetery (active from 1857 to 1921) was connected to the synagogue.
 Pioneer Hall: The Order of Native Daughters of the Golden West was organized on these premises, the site of the Pioneer Hall, on September 11, 1886, CHL No. 34.

Demographics

Jackson has large Serbian community and Serbian Orthodox church.

2010
At the 2010 census, Jackson had a population of 4,651. The racial makeup of Jackson was 4,090 (87.9%) White, 32 (0.7%) African American, 94 (2.0%) Native American, 60 (1.3%) Asian, 4 (0.1%) Pacific Islander, 185 (4.0%) from other races, and 186 (4.0%) from two or more races. Hispanic or Latino of any race were 520 people (11.2%).

The census reported that 4,423 people (95.1% of the population) lived in households, 12 (0.3%) lived in noninstitutionalized group quarters, and 216 (4.6%) were institutionalized.

Of the 2,065 households, 537 (26.0%) had children under 18 living in them, 822 (39.8%) were opposite-sex married couples living together, 294 (14.2%) had a female householder with no husband present, 98 (4.7%) had a male householder with no wife present., 120 (5.8%) were unmarried opposite-sex partnerships, five (0.2%) were same-sex married couples or partnerships; 747 households (36.2%) were one person and 438 (21.2%) had someone living alone who was 65 or older. The average household size was 2.14.  Of the 1,214 families (58.8% of households), the average family size was 2.75.

The age distribution was 945 people (20.3%) under 18, 306 people (6.6%) 18 to 24, 1,030 people (22.1%) 25 to 44, 1,197 people (25.7%) 45 to 64, and 1,173 people (25.2%) who were 65 or older.  The median age was 46.0 years. For every 100 females, there were 84.1 males.  For every 100 females 18 and over, there were 79.4 males.

The 2,309 housing units had an average density of ,of which 2,065 were occupied, 1,122 (54.3%) by the owners and 943 (45.7%) by renters.  The homeowner vacancy rate was 4.9%; the rental vacancy rate was 5.8%;  2,305 people (49.6% of the population) lived in owner-occupied housing units and 2,118 people (45.5%) lived in rental housing units.

2000
At the 2000 census, 3,989 people in 1,746 households, including 1,023 families, lived in the city. The racial makeup of the city was 93.5% White, 0.5% Black or African American, 1.4% Native American, 0.6% Asian, 0.1% Pacific Islander, 1.9% from other races, and 2.1% from two or more races. About 6.5% of the population were Hispanics or Latinos of any race.
Of the 1,746 households, 24.0% had children under 18 living with them, 43.8% were married couples living together, 12.0% had a female householder with no husband present, and 41.4% were not families. About 36.1% of households were one person, and 20.0% were one person 65 or older.  The average household size was 2.13, and the average family size was 2.74.

The age distribution was 20.0% under 18, 6.4% from 18 to 24, 21.9% from 25 to 44, 22.9% from 45 to 64, and 28.8% 65 or older.  The median age was 47 years. For every 100 females, there were 80.3 males.  For every 100 females 18 and over, there were 75.3 males.

The median income for a household was $35,944 and for a family was $45,887. Males had a median income of $40,444 versus $35,083 for females. The per capita income for the city was $21,399.  About 4.1% of families and 8.3% of the population were below the poverty line, including 7.3% of those under age 18 and 7.0% of those age 65 or over.

High school
Jackson has only one high school, Argonaut High School. The school's namesake is the Argonaut Mine, located in town.

Notable people
 Robert Grant Aitken, astronomer
 John C. Begovich, politician
 Anthony Caminetti, politician
 Ernest Gallo, winemaker
 James T. Farley, politician

References

 C. Michael Hogan, Gary Deghi et al., Scottsville Project Environmental Impact Report, Jackson California, Earth Metrics Inc., Report 7562, Sept., 1989

External links

 

Incorporated cities and towns in California
Cities in Amador County, California
Populated places established in 1848
County seats in California
1848 establishments in California